This is a list of the National Register of Historic Places listings in Piscataquis County, Maine.

This is intended to be a complete list of the properties and districts on the National Register of Historic Places in Piscataquis County, Maine, United States. Latitude and longitude coordinates are provided for many National Register properties and districts; these locations may be seen together in a map.

There are 57 properties and districts listed on the National Register in the county.  Another 3 properties were once listed, but have since been removed.

Current listings

|}

Former listings

|}

See also

 List of National Historic Landmarks in Maine
 National Register of Historic Places listings in Maine

References

 01
Piscataquis
Buildings and structures in Piscataquis County, Maine
Piscataquis County, Maine